Bernd Eichwurzel (born 25 October 1964 in Oranienburg, Bezirk Potsdam) is a rower who competed for the SG Dynamo Potsdam / Sportvereinigung (SV) Dynamo. He won medals at international rowing competitions. In October 1986, he was awarded a Patriotic Order of Merit in gold (first class) for his sporting success.

References

External links
 
 

1964 births
Living people
People from Oranienburg
People from Bezirk Potsdam
East German male rowers
Sportspeople from Brandenburg
Olympic medalists in rowing
Olympic gold medalists for East Germany
Medalists at the 1988 Summer Olympics
World Rowing Championships medalists for East Germany
Recipients of the Patriotic Order of Merit in gold
Olympic rowers of East Germany
Rowers at the 1988 Summer Olympics